The 1987–88 Liga Bet season saw Maccabi Acre, Hapoel Daliyat al-Karmel, Maccabi Shikun HaMizrah and Hapoel Be'er Ya'akov win their regional divisions and promoted to Liga Alef.

At the bottom, Maccabi Kiryat Bialik, Hapoel Bnei Acre (from North A division), Hapoel Fureidis, Haopel Yokne'am (from North B division), M.M. Givat Shmuel, Maccabi Bat Yam (from South A division), Maccabi Kiryat Ekron and Hapoel Mevaseret Zion (from South B division) were all automatically relegated to Liga Gimel.

North Division A

North Division B

South Division A

South Division B

References
Alef and Bet Leagues, 1986-87 – 1993-94  Eran R, Israblog 

Liga Bet seasons
Israel
4